Akebono is a Japanese word meaning dawn or the color of the sky at dawn. It may refer to:

Science
 Akebono (fly), a fly genus in the family Sciomyzidae or Phaeomyiidae
 Akebono (satellite), a magnetosphere observation satellite

Ships
 Akebono Maru, several ships
 Japanese destroyer Akebono, several ships of the Imperial Japanese Navy and the Japanese Maritime Self-Defense Force

Other uses
 Akebono (train), a sleeping-car train in Japan
 Akebono Brake Industry, a Japanese manufacturer
 Akebono scale, a common scale used in Japanese music
 Akebono Tarō (born 1969), retired sumo wrestler and professional wrestler
 Kimura Akebono (1872-1890), Japanese novelist